Coker Tire Company is a Chattanooga, Tennessee-based company that manufactures and sells vintage-style Michelin, Firestone, BF Goodrich and Uniroyal bias-ply and radial whitewall tires for collector automobiles. The company was originally a tire and service center founded in 1958 by Harold Coker. He would later give his son Corky Coker the opportunity to manage the antique division, which was a small percentage of the company's earnings. Corky devoted 40 years to growing the antique division of the business, eventually making it the company's primary focus. Corky retired in 2014, and he appointed Wade Kawasaki as President to oversee the operations of six companies and numerous brands under the Coker Group. In November 2018, Corky sold Coker Tire and its parent company, Coker Group, to Irving Place Capital. Wade Kawasaki and his leadership team, remained with Coker Tire. Wade is the current President and CEO.

Though Coker's products retain the appearance of the old tires by using the original, refurbished molds, or new molds built from original drawings, the tires are made with modern materials. Coker Tire was given manufacturing rights by the original tire brands, and also has acquired many different tire molds of the original obsolete tires they manufacture. Coker Tire also offers wheels for collector vehicles.

Tires
Coker Tire sells its own brand of bias ply and radial tires, called the Coker Classic, but it also offers a number of popular brands, such as B.F.Goodrich, Firestone, U.S. Royal, Michelin, Vredestein, Excelsior and American Classic in both bias ply and radial construction. Coker Tire is the leading source for Firestone Deluxe Champion tires, as well as B.F.Goodrich Silvertown tires. Many of the tires are exact OEM replacement tires for a wide range of vintage makes and models. Coker also sells modern radial tires, manufactured with whitewalls, redlines and other sidewall treatments, built for many applications. By using refurbished original molds, the tires are authentic to the originals, while the modern manufacturing procedures and materials offer safe and reliable driving characteristics. Coker Tire's President, Corky Coker, has searched the world for discontinued molds that can be rebuilt and used for modern tire manufacturing. On any of Coker's tires with custom sidewall such as a whitewall or a redline, the particular sidewall treatment is actually a part of the manufacturing process, instead of manufacturing a tire, then applying the sidewall treatment after the fact.

In 1994, Coker Tire released a radial tire with a wide whitewall, which was a first of its kind. Coker now sells many brands that offer whitewall radial tires, and distributes a modern radial tire that has the narrow tread profile and distinct shoulders of a vintage bias ply tire. These tires are very popular with enthusiasts who want the vintage look, with the increased driving comfort of a radial tire. Coker Tire also has a Performance Division, which sells mostly drag racing tires. Coker sells Phoenix Race Tires, M&H Racemaster, Pro-Trac, and select Firestone vintage tires through its performance division. Coker has also developed a line of Firestone Indy tires, built for a variety of vintage Indy cars.

Coker Tire also sells what they describe as the largest bicycle tire in the world, at 36 inches in diameter. Other unique offerings are its tires for Vintage Trucks and Military Vehicles, as well as its Vintage Motorcycle tires.

Wheels
Coker Tire sells wheels and wheel accessories for a wide range of applications. Most of its offerings are steel wheels, designed to replace worn out OEM wheels, on makes such as Chevrolet, Ford, Pontiac, Oldsmobile, Mercury, Chrysler, Buick, Volkswagen and many others. Coker also offers OEM wire wheels for Buick, Cadillac, Chrysler, Packard, Ford Model A and Ford Thunderbird but also offers custom wire wheels for hot rods. Coker sells custom wheels for hot rods and other modified collector vehicles. Coker is also a distributor for Rocket Racing Wheels and Dayton Wire Wheels.  Hubcaps, trim rings valve stems and other tire and wheel accessories are offered by Coker. Coker proudly advertises that it will provide free mounting and balancing if customers buy tires and wheels together.

Memorabilia
With official licensing for Michelin vintage products, as well as Firestone vintage products, Coker Tire sells automotive memorabilia, in addition to its tires, wheels and accessories. Metal signs, neon clocks, and poly-resin figurines are available items. Coker also sells die cast vehicles, and other collectible merchandise.

Bicycles and unicycles
Coker markets the following bicycles:

 "Wheelman", a penny-farthing, with a  wheel in front and a  wheel behind;

 cruiser-style bicycle with 36 inch wheels called the "Monster Cruiser";

 two touring-style unicycles called "The Big One" and the "V2", each with a 36-inch tire and wheel combination.

References

External links
 Coker Tire
 Coker Cycles

Tire manufacturers of the United States
Cycle manufacturers of the United States
Cycle parts manufacturers
Companies based in Chattanooga, Tennessee